The robust frog (Austrochaperina robusta) is a species of frog in the family Microhylidae.
It is endemic to Australia.
Its natural habitats are subtropical or tropical moist lowland forests and subtropical or tropical moist montane forests.
It is threatened by habitat loss.

References

Austrochaperina
Amphibians of Queensland
Taxonomy articles created by Polbot
Amphibians described in 1912
Frogs of Australia